New Synagogue may refer to:

China
 New Synagogue (Harbin)
 New Synagogue (Shanghai)

France 
 New Synagogue (Strasbourg)

Germany
 New Synagogue (Berlin)
 New Synagogue (Darmstadt)
 New Synagogue (Dresden)
 New Synagogue (Düsseldorf)
 New Synagogue (Mainz)

Poland 
 New Synagogue (Gliwice)
 New Synagogue (Opole)
 New Synagogue (Ostrów Wielkopolski)
 New Synagogue (Przemyśl)
 New Synagogue (Tarnów)
 New Synagogue (Wrocław)

Slovakia
 New Orthodox Synagogue (Košice)
 New Synagogue (Žilina)

United Kingdom 
 New West End Synagogue

See also
 Old New Synagogue in Prague
 Old Synagogue (disambiguation)